Ourhoud Oil Field is an oil field located in Ouargla Province. It was discovered in 1994 and developed by Sonatrach.

References 

Oil fields in Algeria